Benthamia is a genus of orchids. It contains 29 recognized species, all native to Madagascar, Mauritius and Réunion.

List of species 

Benthamia bathieana Schltr., Repert. Spec. Nov. Regni Veg. Beih. 33: 25 (1924).
Benthamia calceolata H.Perrier, Bull. Soc. Bot. France 81: 32 (1934).
Benthamia catatiana H.Perrier, Bull. Soc. Bot. France 81: 29 (1934).
Benthamia chlorantha (Spreng.) Garay & G.A.Romero, Harvard Pap. Bot. 3: 53 (1998).
Benthamia cinnabarina (Rolfe) H.Perrier, Bull. Soc. Bot. France 81: 38 (1934).
Benthamia cuspidata H.Perrier, Bull. Soc. Bot. France 81: 29 (1934).
Benthamia dauphinensis (Rolfe) Schltr., Repert. Spec. Nov. Regni Veg. Beih. 33: 25 (1924).
Benthamia elata Schltr., Repert. Spec. Nov. Regni Veg. 15: 324 (1918).
Benthamia exilis Schltr., Repert. Spec. Nov. Regni Veg. Beih. 33: 26 (1924).
Benthamia glaberrima (Ridl.) H.Perrier, Bull. Soc. Bot. France 81: 28 (1934).
Benthamia herminioides Schltr., Repert. Spec. Nov. Regni Veg. Beih. 33: 27 (1924).
Benthamia humbertii H.Perrier, Bull. Soc. Bot. France 81: 35 (1934).
Benthamia longicalceata H.Perrier, Notul. Syst. (Paris) 14: 139 (1951).
Benthamia macra Schltr., Repert. Spec. Nov. Regni Veg. Beih. 33: 28 (1924).
Benthamia madagascariensis (Rolfe) Schltr., Beih. Bot. Centralbl. 34(2): 300 (1916).
Benthamia majoriflora H.Perrier, Notul. Syst. (Paris) 14: 140 (1951).
Benthamia melanopoda Schltr., Repert. Spec. Nov. Regni Veg. Beih. 33: 29 (1924).
Benthamia misera (Ridl.) Schltr., Repert. Spec. Nov. Regni Veg. Beih. 33: 24 (1924).
Benthamia monophylla Schltr., Repert. Spec. Nov. Regni Veg. Beih. 33: 30 (1924).
Benthamia nigrescens Schltr., Beih. Bot. Centralbl. 34(2): 301 (1916).
Benthamia nigrovaginata H.Perrier, Bull. Soc. Bot. France 81: 32 (1934).
Benthamia nivea Schltr., Repert. Spec. Nov. Regni Veg. Beih. 33: 31 (1924).
Benthamia perfecunda H.Perrier, Notul. Syst. (Paris) 14: 140 (1951).
Benthamia perularioides Schltr., Repert. Spec. Nov. Regni Veg. Beih. 33: 32 (1924).
Benthamia praecox Schltr., Beih. Bot. Centralbl. 34(1): 303 (1916).
Benthamia procera Schltr., Beih. Bot. Centralbl. 34(1): 301 (1916).
Benthamia rostrata Schltr., Repert. Spec. Nov. Regni Veg. Beih. 33: 33 (1924).
Benthamia spiralis (Thouars) A.Rich., Mém. Soc. Hist. Nat. Paris 4: 39 (1828).
Benthamia verecunda Schltr., Repert. Spec. Nov. Regni Veg. Beih. 33: 34 (1924).

References 

 

Orchideae genera
Orchids of Madagascar
Flora of Mauritius
Orchids of Réunion
Orchideae